These are the official results of the Women's 100 metres event at the 2003 IAAF World Championships in Paris, France. There were a total number of 59 participating athletes, with eight qualifying heats, four quarter-finals, two semi-finals and the final held on Sunday 24 August 2003 at 19:45h.

Final

Kelli White crossed the finish line in first place in a time of 10.85 seconds, and Zhanna Block finished third in 10.99 seconds. However, both were later disqualified for anti-doping violations.

Semi-final
Held on Sunday 24 August 2003

Quarter-finals
Held on Saturday 23 August 2003

Heats
Held on Saturday 23 August 2003

References

 

H
100 metres at the World Athletics Championships
2003 in women's athletics